Mompha is a genus of moths in the family Momphidae that was first described by Jacob Hübner in 1819. It has four subgenera.

Subgenus Anybia
The genus Anybia was described by Henry Tibbats Stainton in 1854 and was later demoted to a subgenus. The type species is Tinea langiella Hübner, 1796 (= Alucita epilobiella Römer, 1794).

Subgenus Cyphophora
The biggest species of the genus are found in this subgenus. The genus Cyphophora was described by Gottlieb August Wilhelm Herrich-Schäffer in 1853 and was later demoted to a subgenus. The type species is Elachista idaei Zeller, 1839.

Subgenus Lophoptilus
The genus Lophoptilus was described by John Sircom in 1848 and was later demoted to a subgenus. The type species is Lophoptilus staintoni Sircom, 1848 (= Tinea miscella [Denis & Schiffermüller], 1775).

Subgenus Psacaphora
The genus Psacaphora was described by Herrich-Schäffer in 1853 and was later demoted to a subgenus. The type species is Tinea schrankella Hübner, 1805 (= Tinea locupletella Denis & Schiffermüller, 1775).

Species

Mompha achlyognoma Koster & Harrison, 1997
Mompha albapalpella (Chambers, 1875)
Mompha albella (Chambers, 1875)
Mompha annulata (Braun, 1923)
Mompha argentimaculella (Murtfeldt, 1900)
Mompha bicristatella (Chambers, 1879)
Mompha bifasciella (Chambers, 1876)
Mompha bottimeri Busck, 1940 - Bottimer's mompha moth
Mompha bradleyi Riedl, 1965
Mompha brevivittella (Clemens, 1864)
Mompha canicinctella (Clemens, 1863)
Mompha capella Busck, 1940
Mompha cephalonthiella (Chambers, 1871) - buttonbush leafminer moth
Mompha circumscriptella (Zeller, 1873) - circumscript mompha moth
Mompha claudiella Kearfott, 1907
Mompha cleidarotrypa Koster & Harrison, 1997
Mompha coloradella (Chambers, 1877)
Mompha communis (Braun, 1925)
Mompha confusella Koster & Sinev, 1996
Mompha conturbatella (Hübner, 1819) - fireweed mompha moth
Mompha deceptella (Braun, 1921)
Mompha definitella (Zeller, 1873)
Mompha difficilis (Braun, 1923)
Mompha divisella Herrich-Schäffer, 1854
Mompha edithella (Barnes & Busck, 1920)
Mompha eloisella (Clemens, 1860) - red-streaked mompha moth
Mompha epilobiella (Denis & Schiffermüller, 1775)
Mompha falclandica Wakeham-Dawson & Koster, 2013
Mompha franclemonti Hodges, 1992
Mompha glaucella Sinev, 1986
Mompha idaei (Zeller, 1839)
Mompha ignotilisella (Chambers, 1875)
Mompha jurassicella (Frey, 1881)
Mompha lacteella (Stephens, 1834)
Mompha langiella (Hübner, 1796)
Mompha locupletella (Denis & Schiffermüller, 1775)
Mompha luciferella (Clemens, 1860)
Mompha meridionella Koster & Sinev, 2003
Mompha metallifera (Walsingham, 1882)
Mompha millotella Viette, 1955
Mompha minimella (Chambers, 1880)
Mompha miscella (Denis & Schiffermüller, 1775)
Mompha murtfeldtella (Chambers, 1875)
Mompha nancyae Clarke, 1990
Mompha nuptialis Meyrick, 1922
Mompha ochraceella (Curtis, 1839)
Mompha passerella (Busck, 1909)
Mompha pecosella Busck, 1907
Mompha powelli (Busck, 1909)
Mompha propinquella (Stainton, 1851)
Mompha purpuriella (Busck, 1909)
Mompha raschkiella (Zeller, 1839)
Mompha rufocristatella (Chambers, 1875)
Mompha sexstrigella (Braun, 1921)
Mompha solomoni D.L. Wagner, Adamski & R.L. Brown, 2004
Mompha stellella Busck, 1906
Mompha sturnipennella (Treitschke, 1833)
Mompha subbistrigella (Haworth, 1828)
Mompha terminella (Humphreys & Westwood, 1845)
Mompha trithalama Meyrick, 1927
Mompha unifasciella (Chambers, 1876)

References

External links
 Lepiforum e.V.

Momphidae
Moth genera
Taxa named by Jacob Hübner